American actress Sharon Stone has won 10 awards from 41 nominations, including one Emmy Award, one Golden Globe Award, two MTV Movie Awards, and one Satellite Award. She has also received several "dishonors" for poor performances in films, earning three Golden Raspberry Awards, and two Stinkers Bad Movie Awards.

Stone's breakout role as Catherine Tramell in Basic Instinct (1992) earned her a Chicago Film Critics Association Award, Golden Globe Award, and Saturn Award nominations. This was followed by two nominations for MTV Movie Award for Most Desirable Female for the films Sliver (1993) and The Specialist (1994). For her role as Ginger McKenna in Casino (1995), she won the Golden Globe Award for Best Actress in a Motion Picture – Drama and received an Academy Award nomination, in the Best Actress category. She guest starred as an attorney who believes she can communicate with God in The Practice (1997–2004), a role that earned her the Primetime Emmy Award for Outstanding Guest Actress in a Drama Series.  In Basic Instinct 2 (2006), her return to the character Tramell received mixed critical reviews, and garnered her a Golden Raspberry Award.

Stone has also received a number of non-performance honors. She was inducted to the Hollywood Walk of Fame in 1995 for her contribution to acting. The actress was nominated for Golden Apple Award for being easy to work with according to her co-stars. In 2005, she was named Officer of the Order of Arts and Letters in France (Commander in 2021). She received recognition at the 2006 Women Film Critics Circle Awards for her collaborations with AmfAR with their research on AIDS.

Awards and nominations

Other honors 
Throughout her career, Stone has received several other awards for her work in film. In 1992, she won the Bravo Otto silver medal in the Best Actress category. She was given a star on the Hollywood Walk of Fame in 1995 for her contribution to motion pictures. It is located at 6925 Hollywood Blvd. Stone received the Hamptons International Film Festival award for Outstanding Achievement in Acting in 2009. The actress was also awarded the Women in Film Crystal + Lucy Awards in 1995 and 2000. She also won the Karlovy Vary International Film Festival Special Prize for Outstanding Contribution to World Cinema in 2005, and an honorary award at the Marrakech International Film Festival in 2013 as part of a tribute to her career. The AARP Movies for Grownups Awards, which recognizes contributions to film by actors over the age of fifty, honored Stone with a Career Achievement Award in 2012. In 2021, Stone received the Golden Icon Award at the Zurich Film Festival for her acting career.

Stone has also been awarded for activities other than acting. In 1996, she was nominated for the Golden Apple Award for being easy to work with according to her co-stars. On May 20, 2005, she was named Officer of the Order of Arts and Letters in France (Commander on 16 July 2021). She received recognition at the 2006 Women Film Critics Circle Awards for her collaborations with AmfAR on their research on AIDS. On October 23, 2013, Stone received the Peace Summit Award for her work with HIV/AIDS sufferers. In 2015, Stone was guest of honor at the Pilosio Building Peace Award in Milan. She began an impromptu auction on stage in front of a crowd of CEOs from the construction industry and other dignitaries, gaining enough pledges to build 28 schools in Africa.

The Kiev Museum of Wax Figures included a Sharon Stone wax figure. It is modeled after the scene in Basic Instinct in which she uncrosses her legs and exposes her genitalia during a police interrogation. Yevhen and Oleksy Sazhyn, the father and son running the museum, reported that the design process for the figure took eight months. They found sculptures based on women were more difficult to plan than those on men. For the creation of the Sharon Stone figure, they said: "capturing her legs in just the right position was tricky business".

Notes

References

Citations

Bibliography

External links
 List of awards and nominations at the Internet Movie Database

Commandeurs of the Ordre des Arts et des Lettres
Lists of awards received by American actor
Awards